Cowboy Songs Four is the twenty-first album by American singer-songwriter Michael Martin Murphey, his fourth album of cowboy songs, and his first album produced by his son, Ryan Murphey. The album features a guest performance by Lyle Lovett on "Farther Down the Line".

Track listing
 "Song from Lonesome Dove" (Murphey) – 4:58
 Trail Song Medley: "Colorado Trail" / "Twilight on the Trail" / "Navaj Trail" / "Riding Down the Canyon" / "Blue Shadows on the Trail" – 5:47
 "Born to Be a Cowboy" (Hampton) – 5:36
 "Farther Down the Line" (Lovett, Goldsen) – 3:36
 "Born to Buck Bad Luck" (Murphey) – 3:46
 "Easy on the Pain" (Murphey, Westergen) – 3:51
 "Utah Carroll" (Traditional) – 3:29
 "Freewheeler" (Winchester) – 3:13
 "Rangeland Rebel" (Murphey) – 4:46
 "Run Toward the Light" (Murphey, Murphey) –4:10
 "The Bunkhouse Orchestra" (Murphey) – 2:05
 "Little Joe, the Wrangler" (Thorp, Traditional) – 4:07
 "Summer Ranges" (Murphey) – 3:37
 "Old Horse" (Murphey) – 5:11
 "Night Hawk" (Murphey) – 8:04

Credits
Music
 Michael Martin Murphey – vocals, acoustic guitar, harmonica, background vocals, arranger
 Ryan Murphey – electric guitar, acoustic guitar, chart, background vocals, arranger, producer
 Pat Flynn – acoustic guitar
 Sonny Garrish – steel guitar
 Jonathan Yudkin – fiddle
 Hank Singer – fiddle
 David Coe – fiddle
 Dennis Burnside – piano
 Joey Miskulin – accordion
 David Hungate – electric bass
 Craig Nelson – acoustic bass
 Bob Mater – drums
 Todd D. Smith – shouts
 Lyle Lovett – vocals

Production
 Gary Paczosa – engineer
 Craig A. Wolf – engineer
 Steve Tveit – studio manager
 Vernell Hackett – photography

References
Notes

Citations

External links
 Michael Martin Murphey's Official Website

1998 albums
Michael Martin Murphey albums
Sequel albums